Denver Mukamba (born 21 December 1992) is a Zimbabwean footballer, who currently plays for Zimbabwe Premier Soccer League side Ngezi Platinum and the Zimbabwe national team.

Career

Club
Mukamba's professional career began with Kiglon, from Kiglon he went on to join Dynamos in 2011 where he won two Zimbabwe Premier Soccer Leagues, two Mbada Diamonds Cups and one Soccer Star of the Year award. He also had a trial with Maritzburg United. At the start of 2013 he left Dynamos and Zimbabwe behind to sign for South African club Bidvest Wits. He made just 9 league appearances for the club over two seasons, this was partly due to him being loaned out for the 2014-15 season to the University of Pretoria.

For Tuks, he made 20 appearances and scored 3 goals in all competitions before returning to Bidvest. Upon returning to Bidvest, Mukamba was immediately signed by Jomo Cosmos. His debut for Jomo came on 13 September 2014 in a home defeat to Platinum Stars. After 14 appearances and 2 goals in all competitions in 2015–16, Mukamba was released by Jomo and subsequently signed by former club Dynamos. In 2018, Mukamba was loaned out to Caps United after having some problems with his Coach Lloyd Mutasa. Mukamba was then frozen out at Dynamos by Lloyd Mutasa, leading to the loan deal.

In January 2019, Mukamba joined Manica Diamonds. He then moved to Chapungu United in the summer 2019, before joining Ngezi Platinum in January 2020.

International
Mukamba has won 8 caps for the Zimbabwe national team, with his debut coming in 2011 versus South Africa. His first international goal came in 2013 in a 2–1 friendly win versus Botswana. He played in five of Zimbabwe's 2014 FIFA World Cup qualification matches. Before playing for the senior side, Mukamba played for the Zimbabwe U23s.

Career statistics

International
.

International goals
. Scores and results list Zimbabwe's goal tally first.

Honours

Club
Dynamos
Zimbabwe Premier Soccer League (2): 2011, 2012,
Mbada Diamonds Cup (2): 2011, 2012

Individual
Soccer Star of the Year (1): 2012

References

External links
 
 

1992 births
Living people
Sportspeople from Harare
Zimbabwean footballers
Zimbabwean expatriate footballers
Zimbabwe international footballers
Association football midfielders
Bidvest Wits F.C. players
Dynamos F.C. players
University of Pretoria F.C. players
Jomo Cosmos F.C. players
CAPS United players
Chapungu United F.C. players
Zimbabwean expatriate sportspeople in South Africa
Expatriate soccer players in South Africa
Ngezi Platinum F.C. players
Zimbabwe A' international footballers
2011 African Nations Championship players
2020 African Nations Championship players